Kazuo Tanaka from the University of Electro-Communications, Tokyo, Japan was named Fellow of the Institute of Electrical and Electronics Engineers (IEEE) in 2014 for contributions to fuzzy control system design and analysis.

References

External links
IEEE Explore Bio

Fellow Members of the IEEE
Living people
Year of birth missing (living people)
Place of birth missing (living people)